Govind may refer to:
An alternate spelling of Govinda, which is a name in Hinduism given to the god Krishna. It means "cowherd."
The name Govind is commonly used in Sikhism to refer to God. It is derived from "Gobinda" which means Preserver of the World in Gurmukhi. In the Guru Granth Sahib, the Sikh Scripture there are many reference of this word. One example is: "Every day, hour and moment, I continually sing and speak of Govind, Govind, the Lord of the Universe. ||1||" (Guru Granth Sahib Page 404).
Govind is sometime the name used to refer to the Tenth Sikh Guru, Guru Gobind Singh. Although, this is more commonly written as 'Gobind'. The Dasam Granth, which is the second Sikh Scripture written by the Tenth Guru, has two references to 'Govind':
On Page 643, Line 3: "O Lord! I have forsaken all other doors and have caught hold of only Thy door. O Lord! Thou has caught hold of my arm; I, Govind, am Thy serf, kindly take (care of me and) protect my honour. 864."
On Page 728, Line 4: "All the gods, taking permission of Krishna, bowed their heads and went back to their abodes; in their delight, they have named Krishna as `Govind`."

See also 
 Govinda (disambiguation)

References 
 Guru Granth Sahib
 Dasam Granth
 Dictionary of Guru Granth Sahib by S S Kohli

Sikh terminology
Titles and names of Krishna